This is a list of romance manga.

# 

 11 Eyes
 1/2 Prince

A 

 Absolute Boyfriend
 Acchi Kocchi
 Addicted to Curry
 Age 12
 Aiki
 Ai-Ren 
 Air Gear
 Akagami no Shirayukihime
 Akaneiro ni Somaru Saka
  Aki Sora
 Akuma de Sourou
 Aishiteruze Baby
 Ane Doki
 Ane no Kekkon
 Aozora Yell
 Asu no Yoichi
 Ayashi no Ceres

B 

 Bakuman
 Bara no Tame ni
 Barajou no Kiss
 Beast Master
 Beauty Pop
 Bitter Virgin
 Black Bird
 Black Rose Alice
 Blood Alone
 B.O.D.Y
 Boku wa Tomodachi ga Sukunai
 Bokura ga Ita
 Btooom!

C 

 Campione!
 Ceres, Celestial Legend
 Change 123
 Code:Breaker
 Crash!
 Charming Junkie
 Cherry Juice

D 

 Dance in the Vampire Bund
 Date a Live
 DearS
 Defense Devil
 Dengeki Daisy
 Desire Climax
 Detective Conan
 The Devil Does Exist
 DNAngel
 Dōse Mō Nigerarenai
 Doubt!!

E 

 Elfen Lied
 Enchanter
 Evergreen

F 

 Faster than a Kiss
 Final Approach
 Fortune Arterial
 Fruits Basket
 Fushigi Yuugi
 Fushigi Yuugi Genbu Kaiden
 Full Contact
 Full Metal Panic!
 Full Moon O Sagashite

G 

 Gakuen Polizi
 Gakuen Alice
 GE - Good Ending
 Girls Saurus
 Girls Saurus DX
 Golden Time
 Gosick
 Gou-dere Sora Nagihara
 Green Green

H 

 H2
 Hachimitsu ni Hatsukoi
 Hagure Yuusha no Estetica
 Hakushaku to Yousei
 Hana Kimi
 Hanakun to Koisuru Watashi
 Hana Yori Dango
 Hanjuku-Joshi
 Hapi Mari
 Happy Cafe
 Happy Hustle High
 Happy World
 Hayate the Combat Butler
 He's My Only Vampire
 Hidan no Aria
 High School Debut
 High School DxD
 Hiyokoi
Hirunaka no Ryuusei
 Holy Knight
 Horimiya
 Honey Hunt
 Honey So Sweet

I 

 Ichigo 100%
 Infinite Stratos
 Inuyasha
 Iris Zero
 Isuca
 Itazura na Kiss

J 

 Jigokuren - Love in Hell
 Joō no Hana

K 

 Kaichou wa Maid-Sama!
 Kaikan Phrase
 Kamisama Hajimemashita
 Kampfer
 Kanojo ga Flag o Oraretara
 Kanokon
 Kare First Love
 Kare Kano
 Karin
 Kemeko Deluxe
 Kikou Shoujo wa Kizutsukanai
 Kimi ni Todoke
 Kimi No Iru Machi
 Kirarin Revolution
 KissxSis
 Kiss Him, Not Me
 Kodomo no Jikan
 Koko ga Uwasa no El Palacio
 Koi to Senkyo to Chocolate
 Koukou Debut
 Kure-nai
 Kurohime
 Kyō, Koi o Hajimemasu

L 

 Ladies vs Butlers!
 Land of the Blindfolded
 Like a Butterfly
 Lilim Kiss
 Liselotte and Witch's Forest
 Listen to Me, Girls. I Am Your Father!
 Lore Olympus
 Lotte no Omocha!
 Love Attack!
 Love Hina
 Lovely Complex

M 

 Maburaho
 Maga-Tsuki
 Magico
 Magikano
 Mahōka Kōkō no Rettōsei
 Mai-Hime
 Maken-ki
 Maoyuu Maou Yuusha
 Marmalade Boy
 Marriage Royale
 Mars
 Masca
 Mayo Chiki'
 Mayoi Neko Overrun Medaka Box Mei-chan no Shitsuji Mel Kano Mermaid Melody Meteor Prince Midnight Secretary Mirai Nikki Missions of Love Monster Musume Mx0 My Little Sister Can't be This Cute My Lovely Ghost Kana Mysterious Girlfriend X N 

 Naisho no Tsubomi Nagasarete Airantou Nana Narue no Sekai Nagareboshi Lens Negima! Magister Negi Magi Nigeru wa Haji da ga Yaku ni Tatsu Nisekoi Nōnai Poison Berry O 

 Onidere Orange Ore no Kanojo to Osananajimi ga Shuraba Sugiru Otoko no Isshō Otoyomegatari Ouran High School Host Club Okane ga nai

 P 
 Papa To Kiss In The Dark
 Papillon (manga)
 Paradise Kiss
 Pastel (manga)
 Peach Girl
 Perfect Girl Evolution
 Princess Lover
 Princess Lucia
 Psyren

 Q 

 R 

 Ranma ½
 Rappi Rangai
 REC
 Renai Boukun
 Rental Magica
 ReRe Hello Rosario + Vampire
 Rockin' Heaven

 S 

 Sailor Moon Sand Chronicles Sankarea Say "I love you" Seiken no Blacksmith Seikoku no Ryuu Kishi Seikon no Qwaser Seiyū ka-! Senpai to Kanojo Sensual Phrase Sekirei Shakugan no Shana Shiki no Zenjitsu Shina Dark Shugo Chara Skip Beat! So, I Can't Play H! Special A Stellar Theater Stepping on Roses Superior Suzuka Sword Art Online SWOT T 

 Tasogare Otome x Amnesia Taiyō no Ie The Breaker: New Waves The Bride of the Water God The World God Only Knows To Love Ru Tokyo Alice 
 Tokyo Ravens Tokyo Tarareba Musume Tonari no Kaibutsu-kun Tora Dora Trinity Seven True Love U 

 Ultra Cute
 Ultra Maniac

 V 

 Vampire Knight

 W 

 We Were There (manga)
 White Album
 Wild Act
 Watashi ni xx Shinasai!
 Watashi no Messiah-sama
 Watashitachi no Tamura-kun
 Witch Craft Works

 X 

 Y 

 Yahari Ore no Seishun Love Come wa Machigatteiru Yamada-kun to 7-nin no Majo Yasuko to Kenji Yomeiro Choice Yume Miru Taiyō Yumeiro Patissiere Yumekui Merry''

Z 

 Zero No Tsukaima
 Zettai Kareshi
 Zettai Karen Children

See also
List of romance comics

References

 
Romance
Romance